Manetas or Manettas (Μανέτας/Μανέττας) is a Greek surname, common in Arcadia. It can refer to:

 Panagiotis Manetas (1837–1908), Greek politician
 Ioannis Manetas (1878–1943), Greek politician
 Konstantinos Manetas (1879–1960), Greek general and politician
 Theodoros Manetas (1881–1947), Greek general and politician
 Miltos Manetas (born 1964), Greek painter

Greek-language surnames
Surnames